Bernard Lewison (February 7, 1902 – January 13, 1984) was an American politician and businessman.

Born in Viroqua, Wisconsin, Lewison went to Lawrence University. He was a farmer, automobile dealer, body shop owner, saving and loan director, and real estate broker. Lewis served on the Vernon County, Wisconsin Board of Supervisors, the Viroqua Common Council, and was Mayor of Viroqua 1943–1948. Lewison served in the Wisconsin State Assembly 1955–1957, 1961–1981 as a Republican. He died in Madison, Wisconsin.

Notes

1902 births
1984 deaths
People from Viroqua, Wisconsin
Lawrence University alumni
Businesspeople from Wisconsin
County supervisors in Wisconsin
Wisconsin city council members
Mayors of places in Wisconsin
Republican Party members of the Wisconsin State Assembly
20th-century American businesspeople
20th-century American politicians